The Wherritt House, located at 210 Lexington St. in Lancaster, Kentucky, was listed on the National Register of Historic Places in 1984.

It is a two-story three-bay house with a gable roof on a stone foundation, built in the early 1800s. A brick addition was added in 1830.

References

Houses on the National Register of Historic Places in Kentucky
Federal architecture in Kentucky
Houses completed in 1801
Houses in Garrard County, Kentucky
Lancaster, Kentucky
Log houses in the United States
Log buildings and structures on the National Register of Historic Places in Kentucky
1801 establishments in Kentucky
National Register of Historic Places in Garrard County, Kentucky